Marekaffo is a commune in the Cercle of Yélimané in the Kayes Region of south-western Mali. The administrative centre (chef-lieu) is the small town of Dogofiry. In 2009 the commune had a population of 4,548.

References

External links
.

Communes of Kayes Region